Pandukabhaya (474 BC – 367 BC) was King of Upatissa Nuwara and the first monarch of the Anuradhapura Kingdom and 6th over all of the island of Sri Lanka since the arrival of the Vijaya; he reigned from 437 BC to 367 BC. According to many historians and philosophers, he is the first truly Sri Lankan king since the Vijayan migration, and also the king who ended the conflict between the Sinha clan and the local clans, reorganizing the population. His story is one wrapped in myth and the truth

He was the only child of Princess Unmadachithra (daughter of King Panduvasdew and Queen Baddhakachchana) and Prince Dighagamini (son of Prince Digayu and Princess Disala). Pandula was his teacher and Pandula's son Chandra was his advisors

Origin
There are two prevailing opinions on his origin.
 In the Mahavansa, his mother is Umaddhanie Chithra and father is prince Digha-Gamini who is a relation of the princess
 He has no affiliation to the Aryan dynasty. He is a local hero. (A claim lacking evidence.) The father Digha-Gamini's name Digha has been attempted to be associated with indigenous populations which is false as the name Digha is already found in West Bengal and Orissa regions. West Bengal and Orissa is significant as the Aryan ancestors (Vijaya and Panduvasdeva) of Sinhalese have their origins from the West Bengal and Orissa regions which were regions associated with the ancient Vanga kingdom.

The exchange of people 
Chithra and Digha-Gamini had been made aware of the prophecy at the time of their marriage and had promised ,to put to death any son that Chithra gave birth to. However, once Pandukabhaya was born, Chithra was unwilling to kill the infant, and so she decided to exchange babies with another woman who had given birth to a baby girl that same day.

Chithra announced to her father and husband that she had given birth to a girl. Only her mother, Baddha-Kacchayana, knew of the secret exchange.

The woman who gave up her daughter took Prince Pandukabhaya to a nearby village called Doramadalawa where he would be brought up as a herdsman's son.

The attempts on Pandukabhaya’s life 
The first threat to Pandukabhaya's life came while he was being transported to Dvaramandalaka (Doramadalawa). The woman who had exchanged infants with Chitra carried Prince Pandukabhaya to the village in a covered basket. Unfortunately, she ran into nine of Chitra's brothers (the ones who had wanted their sister to be murdered for fear that her child would kill them). They asked her what she had in the basket and she replied that it contained food. Not satisfied with the answer, they asked her to open up the basket and show them its contents. Luckily, two wild boars happened to run past them, and they forgot about the basket in their eagerness to hunt the animals down. The baby was delivered to the herdsman safely. (the two wild boars were commanders of yakka tribe named Chithraraja & Kalawela in disguise to protect the prince)

That same year, King Panduvasudeva died and Abhaya became his successor. He was not a great king, but he was certainly a kind one and he was well-loved, especially by the poor.

Several years went by and when Pandukabhaya was about seven years old, rumours reached his nine uncles about a boy in Dvaramandalaka who supposedly was a herdsman's son, but who showed all signs of being of royal background. They suspected that this child may be their sister's son, because they had reason to believe that the little girl who was being brought up as a princess in the palace was not Chitra's daughter. They sent out soldiers to kill all boys in the village who were around the same age as their nephew.

It was known that all the boys of Dvaramandalaka bathed at a certain pond, and it was planned that they should be killed while they were bathing. The plan was executed and several young children were murdered. Pandukabhaya, however, had been hiding at the time, and so he escaped death.

While Pandukabhaya's uncles were satisfied at the time that they had eliminated their nephew, some years later they became suspicious again when they heard stories of a village boy who looked more like a prince than a herdsman's son. They attempted to have him killed again, and the attempt failed once more.

When Pandukabhaya was about sixteen years old, Princess Chitra, fearing for her son's safety, arranged to have him live with a Brahman named Pandula.

Once he was old enough to become king, Pandukabhaya left Pandula, married his cousin Pali and fought his uncles to claim his right to the throne. Eight of his ten uncles perished in the war, which lasted for seventeen years. Abhaya, who had never fought against Pandukabhaya, and Girikandasiva, who was Pali's father, were not killed.

Pandukabhaya was a good king and reigned over Sri Lanka for seventy years, leaving the country in a prosperous state when he died.

Services
 Established an organized system of governance.
 Established a post called "Nagara Gutthika" to rule the city and named his uncle Abhaya to the post.
 Ordered the demarcation of all the villages in the island in his tenth year of reign. He was the first king to do so.
 Constructed 3 tanks, namely Abaya Wewa, Gamini Wewa and Jaya Wewa.

In Media
Aba (film), a 2008 film based on the historical legend of King Pandukabhaya
 Mahaviru Pandu (TV series), a TV serial based on the historical legend of King Pandukabhaya

See also
List of Sri Lankan monarchs
History of Sri Lanka

References

External links
 Kings & Rulers of Sri Lanka
 Codrington's Short History of Ceylon
 King Pandukabhaya in Mahavamsa

Sinhalese kings
474 BC births
367 BC deaths

Monarchs of Anuradhapura
House of Vijaya
5th-century BC Sinhalese monarchs
4th-century BC Sinhalese monarchs